Cataraqui may refer to:
 The original townsite of what is now downtown Kingston, Ontario, as founded 1673 to house a French colonial military outpost.
 A rural village west of Cataraqui Cemetery, part of the former Kingston Township.

Both points are within the current Kingston city limits.

See also
Cataraqui (disambiguation)